The Je Khenpo ("The Chief Abbot of the Central Monastic Body of Bhutan"), formerly called the Dharma Raja by orientalists, is the title given to the senior religious hierarch of Bhutan.  His primary duty is to lead the Dratshang Lhentshog (Commission for the Monastic Affairs) of Bhutan, which oversees the Central Monastic Body, and to arbitrate on matters of doctrine, assisted by Five Lopen Rinpoches  (learned masters). The Je Khenpo is also responsible for many important liturgical and religious duties across the country.  The sitting Je Khenpo is also formally the leader of the southern branch of the Drukpa Kagyu sect, which is part of the Kagyu tradition of Himalayan Buddhism. Aside from the King of Bhutan, only the Je Khenpo may don a saffron kabney.

History
According to the dual system of government established by Ngawang Namgyal in the 17th century, the powers of the government of Bhutan were ideally split between the religious branch, headed by the Je Khenpo, and the administrative branch, headed by the Druk Desi. The position of Je Khenpo was granted on merit by election, and typically was given to the most respected monk in the Dratshang Lhentshog (Commission for the Monastic Affairs).  Thus, unlike reincarnation lineages such as the Dalai Lama, Zhabdrung Rinpoche, or Panchen Lama, the position of Je Khenpo was never held by a child but always by a seasoned monk.

Historically, the role of the Je Khenpo was quite powerful. The Je Khenpo and Druk Desi collaborated to disempower the office of the Zhabdrung through finding multiple incarnations of various aspects of the Zhabdrung; both the Je Khenpo and the Druk Desi wanted to retain the power they had accrued through the dual system of government. However, since the establishment of the monarchy in 1907, the relative influence of the Je Khenpo has diminished. Nonetheless, the position remains a powerful one and the Je Khenpo is typically viewed as the closest and most powerful advisor to the King of Bhutan.

The 67th Je Khenpo, Ngawang Thinley Lhundup, died at the age of 84 on 10 June 2005. He was noted as a strict disciplinarian who would not compromise any rules in managing the Central Monastic Body.  In addition to his position as Je Khenpo, he was recognized as the tulku of Nyizergang, the seat of the tertön Woogpa Lingpa, in Wangdue Phodrang Province.

The 70th and present Je Khenpo is Tulku Jigme Chhoeda. He is believed to be the reincarnation of Maitreya as well as the mahasiddha Saraha, Hungchen Kara, Kheuchung Lotsawa, and Pema Tsering.

In 2008, the office of the Je Khenpo was codified as part of the Constitution of Bhutan. Under Article 3 Section 4, the King appoints the Je Khenpo as the spiritual leader of Bhutan on the recommendation of the Five Lopons. In turn, the Je Khenpo appoints, on the recommendation of the Dratshang Lhentshog (Commission for the Monastic Affairs), monks with the nine qualities of a spiritual master and accomplished in ked-dzog (stages of development and completion in Vajrayana practice) as the Five Lopons.

The residences of the Je Khenpo and the Central Monastic Body are:

 Winter residence: Punakha Dzong.
 Summer residence: Tashichho Dzong.

List of Je Khenpos

17th century

18th century

19th century

20th century

21st century

See also
Buddhism in Bhutan
Constitution of Bhutan
Dual system of government
Khenpo

References

State religion in Bhutan
Buddhism in Bhutan
Tibetan Buddhist titles
Tibetan Buddhists from Bhutan
Bhutanese lamas
Bhutanese Buddhist monks
Drukpa Kagyu lamas
Bhutan history-related lists